John Charles Thomas (September 6, 1891December 13, 1960) was an American opera, operetta and concert baritone.

Biography
John Charles Thomas was born on September 6, 1891 in Meyersdale, Pennsylvania. He was the son of a Methodist minister of Welsh descent while his mother, of German immigrant stock, had been an amateur singer. After studying initially for a medical career, Thomas won a scholarship to the Peabody Institute in Baltimore in 1910. He remained there for two years, receiving vocal tuition from Adelin Fermin.

In 1912, Thomas left the Peabody and toured briefly with a musical troupe. He then went to live in Manhattan, New York City, where he performed with a Gilbert and Sullivan operetta company before being contracted by the Shubert brothers to perform in the show The Peasant Girl, which opened in March 1913. For the next nine years, he starred in a series of hit Broadway musicals including Her Soldier Boy, Maytime, Naughty Marietta, and Apple Blossoms (with Fred and Adele Astaire).

Operatic, recital and radio career

Thomas sang in a concert performance of Rimsky-Korsakov's opera Sadko at Manhattan's Carnegie Hall in December 1924. His debut in a fully staged opera occurred in March 1925, as Amonasro in a production of Verdi's Aida, presented by the semi-professional Washington National Opera.

Thomas was earning a great deal of money singing on Broadway but he wanted to gain more experience in opera. During the 1922-28 period, he spent part of each year in Europe, polishing his singing technique and appearing under contract at La Monnaie opera house in Brussels for the seasons of 1925-27. He would return to La Monnaie for 25 more performances in 1928, eight in 1930 and four in 1931. Even more importantly, he appeared with the famous Russian bass Feodor Chaliapin in productions of Faust at the Royal Opera House, Covent Garden, London, in July 1928.

He continued to give recitals in the United States during this period and, in 1923, acted in a silent film, Under the Red Robe, directed by Alan Crosland. He made recordings, too, for the Vocalion label (1920–24) and Brunswick Records (1924–29), before signing with RCA Victor in 1931. Thomas also became a pioneer of radio broadcasts, in both New York and Florida. From 1929-32 he was a member of the Philadelphia Grand Opera Company, and in 1930 made one appearance with the Philadelphia Civic Opera Company.

He accepted engagements with the Washington National, San Francisco, Chicago and Philadelphia opera companies, and in 1934, to satisfy a public demand, he was signed by the Metropolitan Opera in New York City. He would remain at the Met until 1943, performing opposite such stars as the soprano Rosa Ponselle.

In the tough Great Depression years of the 1930s, he established himself as one of the most sought-after singers in America, with both a classical-music following and a considerable popular audience. His concerts normally offered selections from both repertoires: classical and operatic to begin, and American art songs and humorous "character" songs to close. He also appeared regularly on commercial radio programs. These included Five-Star Theater (in 1932-33 with the Joseph Bonime Orchestra), the Vince Radio Program (1934–36), the Ford, General Motors and The Magic Key of RCA shows (1937–40) and the Coca-Cola show (1940–41).

In 1938, he helped Edwin Lester launch the Los Angeles Civic Light Opera, appearing in the company's very first production in Blossom Time. This work was derived from a Viennese operetta Das Dreimäderlhaus, with music arranged from that of Schubert and adapted for American audiences by Dorothy Donnelly and Sigmund Romberg. Thomas sang regularly in operettas with the LACLO until 1942, starring in productions of The Gypsy Baron, H.M.S. Pinafore, The Chocolate Soldier and Music in the Air.

The Second World War made concert touring inconvenient, and very high taxes made it non-remunerative. Thomas was duly engaged to star on the Westinghouse Radio Program in 1943-46, accompanied by the Victor Young Orchestra. He probably reached his widest audience during this period, although his practice of performing songs exclusively in English has perhaps left him less well-remembered by today's musical "purists" than he should be. Nevertheless, many songs tailored for him to sing have gone on to become standards, such as the version of "The Lord's Prayer" by Albert Hay Malotte and the arrangement of "Home on the Range" by David W. Guion.

Thomas was among the founders of the Music Academy of the West summer conservatory in 1947.

From 1947 to 1948, Thomas undertook a long and demanding tour of Australia and New Zealand, where he played to crowded theatres. He retired bit by bit from the concert stage after 1950, and settled in Apple Valley, California in 1955 with his wife Dorothy.

Death
He died there in December 1960 from cancer. Owing to his high-spending lifestyle, the fortune that he had earned through singing was largely dissipated at the time of his death.

His home in Apple Valley has been designated as one of the town's historic sites.

Opposition to rock-and-roll music

Thomas appeared twice as a contestant on the TV quiz program "You Bet Your Life", hosted by Groucho Marx.  These episodes aired on 5 December 1957 and 12 December 1957.  He was a strong vocal opponent of rock-and-roll music during the first appearance and debated the subject with advocate Roberta Rene during the second.

Recordings
John Charles Thomas left a large pool of audio recordings, many of which sold extremely well in their day and have been transferred in recent times to compact disc. Only a handful of these recordings, however, are devoted to opera arias. His operatic voice is probably best appreciated in commercial offerings such as "Nemico della patria" from Andrea Chénier, and "C’en est fait… Salomé demande" from Hérodiade. Live broadcast recordings of "Per me giunto" from Don Carlos, "Vien Leonora" from La favorite and "Il balen" from Il trovatore display his  brilliant top notes and bel canto capabilities.

He sang hymns, art songs, ballads, cowboy tunes, introspective German lieder, and shanties.

Voice
Thomas belonged to a sequence of leading American operatic baritones whose overlapping careers stretched in an unbroken line from the 1920s through to the 1990s. They included Richard Bonelli, Lawrence Tibbett, Arthur Endrèze (who was based in Paris), Leonard Warren, Robert Merrill, Cornell MacNeil, Sherrill Milnes and Richard Fredricks.

His lyric voice was more notable for its free top register than for its lower range. It was particularly suited to the French operatic repertoire, in which he was seldom heard in the United States apart from his Athanael in Massenet's Thais. It had remarkable flexibility, which was enhanced by Thomas's energy and expressiveness, particularly in his repertoire of popular material. In operatic work, however, this skill could be shown to good effect in trills and runs. Notable examples of his technical expertise are displayed his versions of "Il balen" from Il trovatore, and the "Drinking Song" from Hamlet.

In common with a lot of singers of his inter-war generation, Thomas's voice was highly distinctive. In part, this may have been due to his early career on Broadway. He knew how to "sell" a song—to build a stirring aria to a climax that would bring audiences to their feet. While the voice was always unmistakably his, it changed noticeably in character over time. His early recordings display a darker tonal hue, and the voice is stiffer, as though he were imitating the stentorian Italian baritone of a previous generation, Titta Ruffo. By 1931, and certainly by 1934, he had found the more fluid, natural vocal style for which he is best remembered. From the late 1940s into the '50s, his vibrato began to widen, though it never became an unpardonable flaw in his singing technique, and the voice grew somewhat thicker and heavier in tone.

Honors
He was a National Patron of Delta Omicron, an international professional music fraternity.
He was awarded a star on the Hollywood Walk of Fame on February 8, 1960.
His rendering of the chorus of "Open Road, Open Sky" from "The Gypsy Baron" was chosen as soundtrack to the Audi TV ad campaign, 2011.

References

External links

[ John Charles Thomas at Allmusic.com]

 John Charles Thomas recordings at the Discography of American Historical Recordings.

Further reading
Thomas, John Charles by Richard LeSueur and Elizabeth Forbes, in 'The New Grove Dictionary of Opera', edited by Stanley Sadie (London, 1992) 
John Charles Thomas, Beloved Baritone of American Opera and Popular Music by Michael J. Maher, McFarland Press, 2006  
Singers to Remember by Harold Simpson, Oakwood Press, Great Britain (circa 1971).

1891 births
1960 deaths
American operatic baritones
Peabody Institute alumni
Vocalion Records artists
Deaths from cancer in California
20th-century American male opera singers
People from Apple Valley, California
Music Academy of the West founders
Singers from California
Classical musicians from California